Christiaan Barnard (1922–2001) was a South African surgeon.

Chris Barnard may also refer to:
Chris Barnard (author) (1939–2015), South African author
Chris Barnard (footballer) (born 1947), Welsh footballer